The Truant Husband is a 1921 American silent comedy film directed by Thomas N. Heffron and starring Mahlon Hamilton, Betty Blythe and Francelia Billington.

Cast
 Mahlon Hamilton as Billy Sayre
 Betty Blythe as Vera Delauney
 Francelia Billington as Sybil Sayre
 Edward Ryan as Bram Woller

References

Bibliography
 Munden, Kenneth White. The American Film Institute Catalog of Motion Pictures Produced in the United States, Part 1. University of California Press, 1997.

External links
 

1921 films
1921 comedy films
1920s English-language films
American silent feature films
Silent American comedy films
American black-and-white films
Films directed by Thomas N. Heffron
Films distributed by W. W. Hodkinson Corporation
1920s American films